Insook Choi (born 1962, in South Korea) is a Korean-American composer. She is the developer of the Scoregraph program.

Compositions
Lit (1992), for tape, released on The Composer in the Computer Age-IV
Unfolding Time in Manifold (1996), with Machine Child
Coney Island (1999), with Machine Child
Voices in Ruins (2000), with Machine Child

Sources

1962 births
Living people
South Korean composers
Women in electronic music
Experimental Music Studios alumni